The 1976 United States Senate election in Massachusetts was held on November 2, 1976. Incumbent Democratic U.S. Senator Ted Kennedy won re-election to his fourth (his third full) term.

Democratic primary

Candidates

Declared
Robert Emmet Dinsmore, candidate for Boston City Council in 1971
Ted Kennedy, incumbent U.S. Senator
Frederick C. Langone, member of the Boston City Council

Withdrawn
Albert Onessimo
Bernard P. Shannon (endorsed Dinsmore)

Results

Republican primary

Candidates
 Michael Robertson, businessman

Results
Robertson was unopposed for the Republican nomination.

Results

See also 
 1976 United States Senate elections

References 

Massachusetts
1976
1976 Massachusetts elections